McLeod is an unincorporated community in Jackson County, Oregon, United States. It lies at the confluence of Big Butte Creek with the Rogue River just downstream of Lost Creek Lake. It is along Oregon Route 62 between Shady Cove and Prospect. The community was named after its 1910 settler William R. McLeod.

References

Unincorporated communities in Jackson County, Oregon
Unincorporated communities in Oregon